Muhammad ibn Abdallah can refer to following people sharing this name:
 Muhammad ibn Abdallah (745–785), famously known as Al-Mahdi was the powerful Abbasid caliph of the Arab Caliphate from 775 to 785.
 Muhammad ibn Abdallah al-Saffah, was the son of Abbasid caliph al-Saffah
 Muhammad al-Nafs al-Zakiyya (d. 762), a descendant of the Prophet Muhammad and a political figure in the early Islamic period
 Muhammad ibn Abdallah, was the son of Abbasid caliph al-Ma'mun and princess Umm Isa. He was the grandson of Harun al-Rashid and Musa al-Hadi
 Muhammad ibn Abdallah al-Mustakfi, (d. 970s) was the 10th-century Abbasid prince and politician.
 Muhammad ibn Abdallah al-Qa'im, also known as Muhammad Dhakirat was the 11th-century Abbasid prince, son of caliph al-Qa'im and father of caliph al-Muqtadi.
 Abu Nasr Muhammad ibn Abdallah al-Mustaʿsim (possibly died 1258) was the thirteenth century Abbasid prince and son of last Abbasid caliph al-Musta'sim
 Muhammad ibn Abdallah (d. 1790; also spelled "Mohammed ben Abdallah"), sultan of Morocco between 1757 and 1790